The Queets Fir is a superlative Douglas fir about 2.5 miles from the Queets River Trail trailhead, on Coal Creek, a tributary of Queets River in the Olympic National Park in Washington State. It was known for fifty years, beginning in 1945, as the largest known fir by volume, and is still largest known in diameter. It was listed as national co-champion Douglas fir by American Forests, and one of only a handful of "undisputed megatrees" in North America with over 800 points.

References

Sources

Further reading

Olympic National Park
Individual trees in Washington (state)
Individual Douglas firs
Jefferson County, Washington